The following is a list of unproduced M. G. Ramachandran projects in alphabetical order. During his career, Indian actor-filmmaker M. G. Ramachandran had worked on a number of projects which never progressed beyond the pre-production stage under his acting commitments or direction. Some of these projects fell into development hell or were officially cancelled.

Adhirooba Amaravathi

Anna Nee En Deivam

Andru Sinthiya Ratham 
The film, directed by C. V. Sridhar, began shooting in the 1960s, but was shelved when Ramachandran walked out after only a few days of shooting.

Bhavani 
The film was written by A. K. Velan and was to be directed by Masthan. Ramachandran's brother Chakrapani produced this film, which got shelved after some progress, but Chakrapani later revived this film as Arasa Kattalai with Ramachandran returning.

Chaaya 
The film was to be produced under the Pakshiraja banner, but failed to commence shoot.

Inaindha Kaigal

Maadi Veettu Ezhai 
In 1966, Ramachandran and J. P. Chandrababu came together for a film titled Maadi Veettu Ezhai, to be produced and directed by the latter. Although the film began shooting, it was shelved due to differences between the two.

Makkal En Pakkam 
The film was abandoned after Ramachandran quit the film industry to enter politics.

Nadodiyin Magan 
The film was to have been a sequel to Ramachandran's Nadodi Mannan (1958), but never came to fruition.

Parama Pitha 
The film was to be based on the life of Jesus. Shooting began, but ceased permanently after Ramachandran backed out. The film was to be shot in full length Eastmancolor and release in year 1961.

Ponniyin Selvan 

In 1958, Ramachandran announced Ponniyin Selvan, a film adaptation of Kalki Krishnamurthy's novel of the same name. Before shooting could begin, Ramachandran met with an accident, and the wound took six months to heal; Ramachandran was unable to continue with the film despite renewing the rights four years later.

Thoongathe Thambi Thoongathe

Uthama Puthiran 
The film would have featured Ramachandran in dual roles, but was shelved after Venus Pictures announced a film with the same name starring Sivaji Ganesan.

References

Bibliography 
 

Ramachandran M